Shahram Entekhabi, born 1963 is an Iranian-born video and installation artist.

Work

He participated in a group exhibition at the Chelsea Arts Museum, where his contribution was sex worker calling cards to which he had added full veils. In July 2009, The New York Times wrote in an art review, Iran Inside Out, regarding a similar piece, Shahram Entekhabi draws chadors in black Magic Marker on images of dating-service models.

Entekhabi caused a stir in Lucerne in January 2011 when he stretched red and white barrier tape across the city's Town Hall Bridge without first securing a permit, impeding traffic on a Friday afternoon.

Foundation and Initiated projects 
  WL PROJECT, curatorial and artistic projects, 2006 
  i RAN Home, presentation of contemporary Iranian visual culture in Berlin, 2009 
  UNITY, contemporary art projects against racism in collaboration with UNICEF in Penang, Malaysia, 2009

References

External links
 Shahram Entekhabi Official Site
 Parasite Architecture Projects – Official Site 2

1963 births
Living people
Exhibition designers
Iranian video artists
Iranian installation artists